Collapsed lung or pneumothorax is an accumulation of air in the chest causing the lung to separate from the chest wall.

Collapsed lung may also refer to:

 Atelectasis, collapse of the air-containing sacs of the lung
 Collapsed Lung (band), a British hip-hop band

See also

 Flail chest, a condition sometimes producing and often confused with pneumothorax